Morreale is a surname of Italian origin. It is a habitational name derived from Monreale, a town in the province of Palermo, Sicily. The word Monreale itself is derived from the words monte and reale, meaning "royal mountain". Notable people with the name include:

 Mike Morreale (born 1971), Canadian football player
 Rossi Morreale (born 1977), American television personality
 Scott Francis Morreale (born 1967) American Businessman, President & CEO

See also
 Gabriella Morreale de Escobar (1930–2017), Italian-born Spanish chemist

References 

Surnames of Italian origin